Apis mellifera iberiensis, or the Spanish bee, is a western honey bee subspecies native to the Iberian Peninsula. It is also found on the Balearic Islands.

Distribution
This subspecies is well characterized towards the south and west of a line passing from Zaragoza to Barcelona in the Iberian Peninsula, belonging to the A lineage of Apis mellifera originating from Africa (formally mis-identified as belonging to the M Lineage originating from central Asia), colonizing Iberia across the Strait of Gibraltar.

Morphology
 Apis mellifera iberiensis have a length of the forewings with an average of 9.226 mm and 3.098 mm  while the width of the subspecies Apis mellifera mellifera is 9.381 mm and 3.0293 mm respectively.
The first description of this bee of the Iberian Peninsula was published in the magazine Bee World, made by B. Adam.
F. Ruttner described it in his book "Biogeography and Taxonomy of Honeybees." in base to the description of B. Adam, but like several authors prior to him (e.g., Goetze, 1964) erroneously equated this bee with the subspecies proposed by Skorikov (1929) as Apis mellifera iberica (Skorikov, however, proposed the name for a subspecies occurring in the Caucasus and based the name on the ancient Greco-Roman designation for the Georgian Kingdom, Caucasian Iberians, existing there in antiquity).  Thus, the name as employed by Ruttner was an error, leaving Apis mellifera iberiensis as the only valid name for this subspecies of honey bees.
B.Adam collect their views on a trip he made in 1959 to Spain and Portugal.

A. m. iberiensis has the body size of European subspecies with forewings narrower and wider abdomen. It is mostly dark brown to jet-black. The darkness is accentuated by the low tomentum and low hairiness. The queens are black almost uniform in color. They are prolific and with high fertility controlled by environmental conditions.
The closing membrane of the cells is watery, the breeding is sensitive to some diseases.

Behavior
They do not typically generate multiple queens (polygyny) in any given hive at swarming time.
Their movements are fast and rather nervous. They exhibit quick defensive reaction, nervousness, and a propensity to swarm. They do make abundant use of propolis.
One or two sentry bees are always present at the entrance of the hive. If the colony is disturbed, the sentries raise a persistent alarm. The hive attack anything that seems threatening for at least 24 hours.

Taxonomy
The name often applied to this subspecie is A.m.iberica, an epithet originally proposed by Skorikov in his 1929 monograph on honey bees. Authors subsequent to Skorikov assumed in error that the iberica referred to the Iberian Peninsula and thereby quickly adopted the name for the subspecie of bees living in Spain and bordering areas. However, the name iberica was based on a Caucasian subspecie of honey bees, the epithet referring to the Greco-Roman designation for the Georgian Kingdom established in that region in antiquity. The true A. m. iberica of Skorikov has nothing to do with the western Mediterranean subspecie of bees, and under the rules of nomenclature the name iberica is not valid for this lineage of honey bees. The corrected and valid name for the subspecie is Apis mellifera iberiensis.

In a comparative  study of A.m.iberiensis and five others sub-species of Apis mellifera including A.m.intermissa, A. m. monticola, A. m. scutellata, A. m. adansonii and A. m. capensis  cleavage maps obtained through the use of restriction enzyme
 showed the Spanish Honey bee contains mtDNA similar to intermissa and also mellifera. Additionally A.m.intermissa belongs to a group shown by experiment to have similar mtD.N.A (mitochondrian D.N.A.), this including monticola, scuttelata, adansonii and capensis. 

In Spanish bee populations, mtDNA haplotypes of African bee strains were found to be frequently present. Migrating bee populations formed the original colonies of bee in western Europe, landing to eventually populate the continent from Africa across the Straits of Gibraltar.

Genoma
The Iberian Peninsula is an area of hybridization between the north of Africa and Europe, the influence of Apis mellifera mellifera is present in bees localized in the northern, and the influence of Apis mellifera intermissa is more present in the south, in the Apis mellifera iberiensis.

A. m. iberiensis DNA is present in the honey bees of the western United States where the honey bees are not native and they were introduced from Spain during the conquest of America.

Presents six haplotypes different, five of them correspond to an evolutionary lineage from Africa and one from West Europa. From this, infer the hybrid nature of this subspecies, which has a predominant influence in the south of the Iberian Peninsula, with a North African component that is gradually replaced towards the north, with Apis mellifera mellifera.

The genetic variability of the microsatellite of the chromosomes, is similar to that of African populations in the number of alleles detected and the values of genetic diversity. This suggests the genetic relationship between populations of Andalusia and North Africa.

Studied be populations of Portugal there were no major differences between different geographical locations. Morphometric studies of Apis mellifera iberiensis populations in Asturias and northern Iberian Peninsula indicated that the Cantabrian Mountains produces insulation allowing for differences between populations.

The results of microsatellites vary markedly between provinces. In Cadiz haplotype homogeneity contrasts with the microsatellite variability, suggesting the occurrence of recent phenomena of introgression from populations with African haplotypes, whose origin is indeterminate.

In the early 1500s, the Apis mellifera iberiensis was introduced to the Americas, and in the following centuries other subspecies were imported, spreading throughout the Americas.

References

mellifera iberiensis
Western honey bee breeds
Insects described in 1999